Events from the year 1958 in Scotland.

Incumbents 

 Secretary of State for Scotland and Keeper of the Great Seal –  John Maclay

Law officers 
 Lord Advocate – William Rankine Milligan
 Solicitor General for Scotland – William Grant

Judiciary 
 Lord President of the Court of Session and Lord Justice General – Lord Clyde
 Lord Justice Clerk – Lord Thomson
 Chairman of the Scottish Land Court – Lord Gibson

Events 
 13 March – Glasgow Kelvingrove by-election results in a Labour gain from the Conservatives
 May – nuclear development: Dounreay materials test reactor achieves criticality
 3 May – Aberdeen Corporation Tramways last operate, leaving Glasgow as the only system in Scotland
 20 May – railway collision at Arklestone Junction, Paisley; 97 injured
 7 June – Ian Donald publishes an article in The Lancet describing the diagnostic use of ultrasound in obstetrics as pioneered in Glasgow
 4 July – St Ninian's Isle Treasure discovered in Shetland by schoolboy Douglas Coutts
 11 July – Peter Manuel hanged at HM Prison Barlinnie for at least seven murders
 18 August – Regional postage stamps of Great Britain are first issued
 1 September – first of the 'Cod Wars' between the U.K. and Iceland over fishing rights breaks out
 15 September – British Railways railbuses introduced on Gleneagles–Crieff–Comrie line
 19 September – John Duncan Mackie is appointed Historiographer Royal
 October – Thurso High School opened
 21 November – construction of the Forth Road Bridge begins
 5 December – Subscriber trunk dialling (STD) is inaugurated on the U.K. telephone network when The Queen dials a call from Bristol to Edinburgh and speaks to the Lord Provost
 25 December – Christmas Day is a public holiday in Scotland for the first time
 Neolithic Tomb of the Eagles on South Ronaldsay in Orkney first explored by Ronald Simison

Births 
 30 January – Derek White, rugby player
 9 February – Sandy Lyle, golfer
 22 February – Gordon Kennedy, actor
 14 April – Peter Capaldi, screen actor
 25 April – Fish (Derek William Dick), neo-progressive rock singer
 26 April – John Crichton-Stuart, 7th Marquess of Bute (John Bute or Johnny Dumfries), racing driver (died 2021)
 3 June – Cameron Sharp, sprinter
 17 May – Alan Rankine, musician and producer
 2 August – Elaine C. Smith, comic actress
 17 August – Fred Goodwin, banker
 30 August – Muriel Gray, broadcaster
 20 September – Maureen Baker, physician
 27 September – Irvine Welsh, novelist, playwright and short story writer
 Christina McAnea, trade union leader
 Harry Ritchie, writer and journalist
 James Robertson, writer

Deaths 
 8 January – Walter Elliot,  Scottish Unionist Party MP (born 1888)
 29 March – Sir William Burrell, shipowner and art collector (born 1861)
 2 April – Mary Barbour,  political activist, local councillor and magistrate (born 1875)
 3 September – Norman Kemp Smith, philosopher (born 1872)
 19 September – Sir John Dick-Lauder, 11th Baronet, soldier (born 1883 in British India)

The arts
 7 May – first broadcast of the BBC television variety show The White Heather Club which airs nationally until 1968

See also 
 1958 in Northern Ireland

References 

 
Scotland
Years of the 20th century in Scotland
1950s in Scotland